Leonard Lloyd Duvall OBE (born 26 September 1961) is a British Labour and Co-operative politician serving as the Leader of the Labour Group in the London Assembly since 2004, and has been the Member of the London Assembly (AM) for Greenwich and Lewisham since 2000. Duvall is a former chair of both the Metropolitan Police Authority and the London Labour Party Regional Board.

Early life and career 
Duvall was born and raised in Woolwich. Duvall was a councillor for the London Borough of Greenwich from 1990 until 2001, during which time he was deputy leader of the council, until 1992, when he became leader, a position he held until his election to the London Assembly. He was one of the founders of the New Local Government Network, chair of the Thames Gateway London Partnership, chair of the Improvement and Development Agency for Local Government, vice-chair of the Local Government Information Unit, a non–executive Director of Millennium Experience Ltd, deputy chair of the Association of London Government, a member of the Council of Europe and Chamber of the Regions, chair of the Commonwealth Local Government Forum (1998–2005), and in 1998 he was appointed an OBE for "services to Local Government in London and to the Thames Gateway Partnership".

London Assembly 
He was first elected as an AM in 2000, and retained his Greenwich and Lewisham seat in the 2004, 2008, 2012, 2016 and 2021 elections. Duval is the only remaining London Assembly member to have served continuously since the London Assembly was established in May 2000. He is leader of the Labour Group on the London Assembly, chair of both the EU Exit Working Group and the GLA Oversight Committee, and Deputy Chair of the Budget and Performance Committee and the Budget and Monitoring Sub-Committee.

Outside the London Assembly, he is a non-executive director of Tilfen Land, a property development company and a board member of the Royal Artillery Museums Trust, his father and grandfather having served as gunners in the Royal Artillery.

Daniel Morgan Inquiry
In 2021 Duvall was praised by the Panel investigating the unsolved 1987 murder of Daniel Morgan for giving effective direction while chair of the Metropolitan Police authority.

References

1961 births
Living people
Labour Co-operative Members of the London Assembly
Councillors in the Royal Borough of Greenwich
Officers of the Order of the British Empire